James Alexander Skelly (born August 1980) is an English musician, singer-songwriter and record producer. Best known as the frontman of The Coral, he embarked on a solo career when the band went on indefinite hiatus in 2012. The band regrouped in 2015. Skelly is the cousin of Miles Kane  

Skelly released his debut solo album, Love Undercover, in June 2013 on Skeleton Key Records, a label he co-founded with Neville Skelly and brother Ian. Skelly was backed by The Intenders, made up of Ian Skelly, Paul Duffy, Nick Power and former members of Tramp Attack and The Sundowners. Skelly has also gone into record production, work with artists including Blossoms, She Drew The Gun, Cut Glass Kings (previously The Circles) and The Sundowners.

Discography

Albums
 Love Undercover (June 2013), Skeleton Key Records

References

1980 births
English male singers
English songwriters
English rock guitarists
English male guitarists
Living people
21st-century English singers
21st-century British guitarists
21st-century British male singers
British male songwriters